Ezabad (also Romanized as ‘Ezābād and Ezz Abad; also known as Izābād) is a village in Rostaq Rural District, in the Central District of Saduq County, Yazd Province, Iran. At the 2006 census, its population was 308, in 82 families.

References 

Populated places in Saduq County